Local elections were held in Malabon on May 9, 2016, within the Philippine general election. The voters elected for the elective local posts in the city: the mayor, vice mayor, the two Congressmen, and the twelve councilors for the city's two Sangguniang Panglungsod districts, six for each district.

Candidates
Incumbent officials are expressed in italics.

Mayor
Incumbent Mayor Antolin "Lenlen" Oreta III is running for a second term. His opponent is incumbent Lone District Representative Josephine Veronique "Jaye" Lacson-Noel.

Vice Mayor
Jeannie Ng-Sandoval is the incumbent. Her opponents are First District Councilor John Anthony Garcia and Councilor Leslie Gutierrez-Yambao.

Representative, Lone District
Incumbent Representative Josephine Veronique "Jaye" Lacson-Noel is on her second term. however, she will instead run for mayor. Former Malabon-Navotas District Representative Federico "Ricky" Sandoval II is her party's nominee. Sandoval will face former Senator and Representative Teresa "Tessie" Aquino-Oreta, mother of Mayor Antolin Oreta III.

Councilors

Team Pusong Malabonian

Team Sanib Lakas

District 1

|-
| colspan="5" style="background:black;"|

District 2

Note: Incumbent Councilor Tiger Mañalac, son of former Malabon chief of police and councilor Boyong Mañalac, was shot dead by riding in tandem, near his home in Brgy. Tinajeros, Malabon. He cannot seek re-election anymore due to his death last January 23, 2016. His eldest son and Tinajeros Sk Chairman Peng was named later as a substitute candidate for the late father’s re-election.

|-
| colspan="5" style="background:black;"|

References

Notes
 SL Part of the primary opposition coalition named Team Sanib Lakas.
 PM Part of the administration coalition named Team Pusong Malabonian.

External links
COMELEC's List of Local Candidates for Verification

Elections in Malabon
Malabon
2016 elections in Metro Manila